Oeser is a surname. People with the surname include:

 Adam Friedrich Oeser (1717–1799), German etcher, painter and sculptor.
 Fritz Oeser (1911–1982), German musicologist 
 Jennifer Oeser (born 1983), German athlete
 Rudolf Oeser (1858–1926), German politician

See also
 Oser (disambiguation)
 Özer

German-language surnames